Jach'a Wayllani (Aymara jach'a big, waylla Stipa obtusa, a kind of feather grass, -ni a suffix, "the big one with Stipa obtusa", also spelled Jachcha Huayllani) is a mountain in the Bolivian Andes which reaches a height of approximately . It is located in the La Paz Department, Loayza Province, Luribay Municipality. Jach'a Wayllani lies southeast of Jach'a Walluni and Tani Tani.

References 

Mountains of La Paz Department (Bolivia)